Elizaveta is a village in the municipality of Bălți in the north of Moldova. Area: 26.77 km2, population: 3,523 at the 2004 Moldovan Census.

References

Villages of Bălți Municipality